The consensus 1964 College Basketball All-American team, as determined by aggregating the results of four major All-American teams. To earn "consensus" status, a player must win honors from a majority of the following teams: the Associated Press, the USBWA, the United Press International and the National Association of Basketball Coaches.

1964 Consensus All-America team

Individual All-America teams 

AP Honorable Mention:

 Rick Barry, Miami (Florida)
 Joe Caldwell, Arizona State
 Freddie Crawford, St. Bonaventure
 Billy Cunningham, North Carolina
 Jim Davis, Colorado
 Ted Deeken, Kentucky
 Wayne Estes, Utah State
 Billy Foster, Drake
 Gail Goodrich, UCLA
 Ira Harge, New Mexico
 Brooks Henderson, Florida
 Les Hunter, Loyola–Chicago
 Wali Jones, Villanova
 Tom Kerwin, Centenary
 Don Kessinger, Ole Miss
 Bud Koper, Oklahoma City
 Clyde Lee, Vanderbilt
 Bennie Lenox, Texas A&M
 Rick Lopossa, Northwestern
 Willie Murrell, Kansas State
 Manny Newsome, Western Michigan
 Flynn Robinson, Wyoming
 Vic Rouse, Loyola–Chicago
 John Savage, North Texas
 Danny Schultz, Tennessee
 Willie Somerset, Duquesne
 Steve Thomas, Xavier
 John Thompson, Providence
 Nick Werkman, Seton Hall
 George Wilson, Cincinnati

Academic All-Americans
Academic All-American teams were announced on March 25, 1964.

See also
 1963–64 NCAA University Division men's basketball season

References 

NCAA Men's Basketball All-Americans
All-Americans